The tamtam, sometimes spelled tam-tam, is a type of gong.

TamTam, Tam-Tam, tamtam, or tam-tam may also refer to:

 Tam-Tam (album), a 1983 album by Amanda Lear
 Tam Tam (Samurai Shodown), a character from the fighting game Samurai Shodown
 Tamtam (rock club) (TaMtAm), a rock club in Saint Petersburg, Russia
 Tam Tam (video game developer), a Japanese video game developer; see List of tactical role-playing video games: 2000 to 2004
 Tamtam, Iran, a village in Kermanshah Province, Iran
 Tam-Tams, a weekly drum circle held Sundays in the summer in Montreal
 Sekhar Tam Tam (born 1951), Indian medical doctor in Grenada
 Slit drum (Vanuatu) or tamtam, a type of slit drum used in the country of Vanuatu
 Tam Tam crackers, an hexagonal crumbly cracker made by Manischewitz

See also 
 
 
 TAM (disambiguation)